Ruston Samuel Kelly (born July 31, 1988) is an American singer-songwriter. After landing a publishing deal with BMG Nashville in 2013, he got his first cut with Tim McGraw's song "Nashville Without You", which appeared on McGraw's album Two Lanes of Freedom. Following a record deal with Razor & Tie's Washington Square, he released his debut EP Halloween produced by Mike Mogis in 2017.

In 2018 Kelly signed with Rounder Records and released his debut studio album Dying Star to generally favorable critical appraisal.

Personal life
Ruston Kelly was born in South Carolina. His family moved frequently because of his father's job. Except he lived in Wyoming, OH for around 8 years. He comes from a musical family. He began playing music and writing songs as a teenager.

Kelly attended Belmont University in Nashville, Tennessee.

Kelly struggled with drug addiction for years and decided to pursue a life of sobriety following an overdose in December 2015. Regarding his recovery he stated, "I went to rehab once, but it was all I could afford, so it was this kind of rehab in North Carolina."

Kelly met singer Kacey Musgraves after performing at the Bluebird Café in Nashville in March 2016. They married in October 2017 and filed for divorce in July 2020.

Discography

Studio albums
 Dying Star (2018)
 Shape & Destroy (2020)
 The Weakness (2023)

EPs
 The Bootleg Sessions (2013)
 Halloween (2017)
 Dirt Emo Vol. 1 (2019)

Singles
 "Asshole (Demo)" (2018)
 "Mockingbird" (2018) - No. 25 Adult Alternative Airplay
 "Weeping Willow" (2019)
 "Brave" (2020)
 "O Holy Night" (2022)
 "The Weakness" (2023) - No. 37 Adult Alternative Airplay

Tours 
Headlining
Dying Star Fall Tour (2018–2019)
Shape and Destroy Fall Tour (2021)

Opening act
Port Saint Joe Tour  (2019)

Songwriting contributions

References

1988 births
Living people
American country singer-songwriters
American male singer-songwriters
Country musicians from South Carolina
Razor & Tie artists
Rounder Records artists